Lillestrom is an abandoned Scandinavian "block settlement" in the Canadian province of Saskatchewan located in Hillsborough No. 132.

See also

 List of communities in Saskatchewan
 Hamlets of Saskatchewan

Hillsborough No. 132, Saskatchewan